Huyton with Roby is a district in the Metropolitan Borough of Knowsley, Merseyside, England.  Formerly the civil parish of Hyton-with-Roby, it contains the settlements of Huyton and Roby.  The district contains 26 buildings that are recorded in the National Heritage List for England as designated listed buildings.   Of these, one is listed at  Grade II*, the middle of the three grades, and the others are at Grade II, the lowest grade.

Originally Huyton and Roby were separate villages that have since been absorbed by urban growth.  Most of the listed buildings are country houses that have been altered for other uses, or churches with associated structures.  The Liverpool and Manchester Railway was built through the district and four of its bridges are listed.  Other listed buildings include two village crosses, one medieval, the other dating from the 19th century, smaller houses, a sports pavilion, and a milestone.

Key

Buildings

References

Citations

Sources

Listed buildings in Merseyside
Lists of listed buildings in Merseyside